Iris Mary Butler (15 June 1905 – 9 November 2002) was an English journalist and historian.

Butler was born in Simla, India, to Sir Montagu Sherard Dawes Butler and his wife Ann. Her brother was the Conservative politician Rab Butler. She wrote for the Eastern Daily Press and in 1967 published an account of the tempestuous relationship between Queen Anne, Sarah, Duchess of Marlborough and Abigail Masham. In 1927, she married Gervas Portal but published works under her maiden name.

Iris Butler's grandson is Justin Welby, the Archbishop of Canterbury, who has served since 2013.

Works

Rule of Three (1967).
The Viceroy's Wife: Letters of Alice, Countess of Reading, from India 1921-1925 (1969).
The Eldest Brother: the Marquess Wellesley 1760-1842 (1973).

Notes

1905 births
2002 deaths
English journalists
People from Shimla
20th-century English historians
British people in colonial India